Vitéz Kornél Oszlányi (25 September 1893 – 16 November 1960) was a Hungarian military officer who served as division commander during World War II.

Military career
Kornél Oszlányi was born 25 September 1893, in Kaposvár, Hungary. He graduated from the Kassaer Infantry Cadet School in 1911. During World War I he was a company commander of the 52nd Infantry Regiment. In the battle of Nowica, Eastern Galicia in July 1917, he was decorated with the Gold Bravery Medal for extraordinary heroism.
 
In 1927 he became a member of the Ministry of Defence. Between 1933 and 1936 he was the Head of Order of Vitéz's National Defence Department. In March 1939 as commanding officer of the 15th Bicycle Battalion with the rank of lieutenant colonel, he took part in the recapture of Kárpátalja. Between 1941 and 1942 he was the commander of the 2nd "József nádor" Infantry Regiment with the rank of colonel.

From November 1942 he fought as the commanding officer of III Corps, 9th Infantry Division from Nagykanizsa at the river Don. During the retreat he led his division with extraordinary heroism, but in  he had to be cruel with his men to maintain discipline.

At the river Don, his division held back the soviet troops for 12 days, and after that, he covered the retreat of the German forces. He suffered serious wounds in the battle, ending his command of 9th Infantry Division.
 
During World War II he was the only person who received in 1944, the Knight's Cross of the Military Order of Maria Theresa. During the invasion of the soviet forces into the Carpathian Basin in 1944, he led the 10th Infantry Division at Kaposvár.

After release from American captivity first he lived in Germany, and from 1951 in the United States of America. He was posthumously promoted to lieutenant general in 1993.

Footnotes

References

 Életrajza
 Magyar Életrajzi Lexikon
 Földi Pál: A Magyar Királyi Honvédség a második világháborúban, Anno Kiadó, 2000, 
 Földi Pál: Horthy tábornokai, Anno Kiadó, 2007, Debrecen, 
 Nemeskürty István: Requiem egy hadseregért, Magvető Könyvkiadó, 1972.

1893 births
1960 deaths
People from Kaposvár
Hungarian soldiers
Austro-Hungarian military personnel of World War I
Austro-Hungarian Army officers
Knights Cross of the Military Order of Maria Theresa